= International cricket in 1895 =

International cricket season

The 1895 international cricket season was from April 1895 to September 1895. The season comprised two minor tours to Netherlands by Ivanhoe Cricket Club of Australia and Worcestershire Gentlemen of England.

== Season overview ==
International tours
Start date	Home team	Away team	Results [Matches]			
Start date	Home team	Away team	Test	ODI	FC	LA
3 June 1895	Netherlands	Australia	—	—	1–0 [1]	—
28 August 1895	Netherlands	Worcestershire	—	—	1–0 [1]	—
